Victoria Bright also known as  Vicky Bright  (born 16 March 1965) is a Ghanaian legal practitioner, politician and philanthropist. She was the Deputy Minister of State at the Presidency under the John Kufuor administration.

Early life and education
She was born in Jamestown in the Greater Accra Region of Ghana. Bright attended Wesley Girls Senior High School for her secondary education. She studied at the University of Sussex, where she obtained a joint honors degree of Bachelor of Arts in Law and French in 1988. Victoria won a scholarship to attend the College of Europe Bruges, graduating with A Master of Laws (LL.M). While at University of Sussex she studied at the University of Strasbourg where she obtained a Diploma in EU and French Law. She successfully completed the Solicitors Final Examinations at the College of Law in Guildford (now University of Law). In January 2021, she got enrolled as scholar at Balliol College, Oxford, Saïd Business School at the University of Oxford to pursue an Executive MBA Programme (EMBA).

Law Practice
Bright joined the legal profession in 1989 as a Trainee Solicitor with Taylor Wessing Solicitors in London. She later joined DLA Piper Solicitors as a Senior Associate. She became Partner in 1999 and is co-founder and Managing Partner of Addison Bright Sloane.

Political life

Member of Parliament bid 
During the 2011 New Patriotic Party Parliamentary Primaries, she lost the Okaikwei South Constituency parliamentary seat to Arthur Ahmed. She filed a petition on the basis of fraud which was rejected.

In 2015, Bright in a re-run for the Okaikwei South Constituency seat accused her main contender, Arthur Ahmed of certificate-cheating and later withdrew on principle a day to the Primaries.

She has served as a member of the advisory board for the Ministry of Lands and Natural Resources of Ghana.

Ministerial appointment 
In January 2008, John Kufuor nominated her as Deputy Minister of State at the Presidency. Prior to her vetting and due to laws that forbid public officials of possessing dual citizenship in Ghana, she duly denounced her British citizenship by showing evidence with requisite fee paid at the Immigration and Nationality Directorate of the British Home Office on July 27, 2007.
 
She was sworn in as Deputy Minister along with Mr Osei Kyei Mensah-Bonsu, Minister of State for Parliamentary Affairs, by John Kufuor on 15 February 2008 at the Osu Castle in Accra.

Philanthropy and Other Work 
Victoria Bright founded the Bright Minds Foundation, a non-profit organisation which provides support to voiceless and marginalised children to protect them from cruelty and abuse. Bright currently serves as a consultant at Albright Stonebridge Group.

References

Living people
21st-century Ghanaian women politicians
Ghanaian philanthropists
Women government ministers of Ghana
20th-century Ghanaian lawyers
Ghanaian Christians
New Patriotic Party politicians
Ghanaian women lawyers
1965 births
21st-century Ghanaian lawyers